The European Milk Board (EMB) is the umbrella organization for 20 associations representing dairy farmers in 15 European countries. Established in 2006, the EMB's main goal are farm-gate prices that cover production costs in the dairy industry.

Organization 
The European Milk Board's president is Romuald Schaber who is also president to German member organization Bundesverband Deutscher Milchviehhalter (BDM e.V.). Its vice president is Sieta van Keimpema, president to Dutch member organization Dutch Dairymen Board (DDB). Since 2012, EMB's secretariat is located in Brussels.

Member organizations 
 Belgium: Flemish Milk Board (FMB), Milcherzeuger Interessensgemeinschaft (MIG)
 Denmark: Landsforeningen af Danske Mælkeproducenter (LDM)
 Germany: Arbeitsgemeinschaft bäuerliche Landwirtschaft (AbL), Bundesverband Deutscher Milchviehhalter (BDM)
 France: Organisation des producteurs de lait (OPL), Association des Producteurs de Lait Indépendants (APLI) 
 Ireland: Irish Creamery Milk Suppliers Association (ICMSA)
 Italy: APL della Pianura Padana
 Croatia: Hrvatski savez udruga proizvođača mlijeka (HSUPM)
 Latvia: Lauksaimnieku organizaciju sadarbibas padome (LOSP)
 Lithuania: Lietuvos pieno gamintoju asociacijos (LPGA)
 Luxembourg: Lëtzebuerger Mëllechbaueren
 Netherlands: Dutch Dairymen Board (DDB), Nederlandse Melkveehouders Vakbond
 Austria: IG-Milch
 Sweden: Sveriges Mjölkbönder 
 Switzerland: Bäuerliche Interessengruppe für Marktkampf (BIG-M), Uniterre 
 Spain: Organización de Productores de Leche (OPL)

Memberships in networks 
 ARC 2020 (Agricultural and Rural Convention)

See also
Deutscher Bauernverband

References

External links 
Website European Milk Board
European Milk Board on Youtube
Monthly Newsletter 2009-to date

Dairy farming
Dairy organizations
Agricultural organisations based in Belgium